Cayuga County Courthouse and Clerk's Office is a historic courthouse complex located at 152 Genesee Street in Auburn, New York. It consists of a two building government complex. The courthouse was built in 1835–1836 to a design by John I. Hagaman in the Greek Revival style, employing a massive Greek Doric order. It was rebuilt and expanded in 1922–1924 after a fire destroyed everything but the front and side walls of the original building. The rebuilt courthouse, designed by Carl Tallman and Samuel Hillger, is a -story, Neoclassical temple-fronted stone building incorporating Hagaman's monumental portico.   Attached to it is the 1882 County Clerk's Office building, designed by Green and Wicks in the Late Victorian Italianate style.

The complex was listed on the National Register of Historic Places in 1991.

See also
National Register of Historic Places listings in Cayuga County, New York

References
Notes

External links

County clerks in New York (state)
County government agencies in New York (state)
Courthouses on the National Register of Historic Places in New York (state)
County courthouses in New York (state)
Government buildings completed in 1836
Buildings and structures in Auburn, New York
Rebuilt buildings and structures in the United States
Burned buildings and structures in the United States
National Register of Historic Places in Cayuga County, New York